Taguig–Pateros's 1st congressional district is one of the two congressional districts of the Philippines in the combined independent local government units of Pateros and Taguig. It has been represented in the House of Representatives of the Philippines since 2007. The district was created in 2004 following a plebiscite to ratify Republic Act No. 8487 or the 1998 Taguig City Charter. It consists of the entire municipality of Pateros and the eastern Taguig barangays of Bagumbayan, Bambang, Calzada, Hagonoy, Ibayo-Tipas, Ligid-Tipas, Lower Bicutan, New Lower Bicutan, Napindan, Palingon, San Miguel, Santa Ana, Tuktukan, Ususan and Wawa. The district is currently represented in the 19th Congress by Ricardo S. Cruz Jr. of the Nacionalista Party (NP).

Representation history

Election results

2022

2019

2016

2013

2010

See also
Legislative districts of Taguig 
Legislative districts of Pateros-Taguig

References

Congressional districts of the Philippines
Politics of Taguig
Politics of Pateros
2004 establishments in the Philippines
Congressional districts of Metro Manila
Constituencies established in 2004